U. Visweswar Rao (died 20 May 2021) was an Indian film, screenwriter, director, producer and playwright known for his works predominantly in Telugu cinema.

Biography
He was a member of the central jury for the 17th National Film Awards.

He was the secretary of the South Indian Film Chamber of Commerce. He has also served as the managing director of South Indian Film Export Promotion Council. He has garnered two National Film Awards, and two state Nandi Awards. He was also associated with the Nandi Awards jury, and has produced around twenty-five films.

Rao died from COVID-19 on 20 May 2021.

Selected filmography
 Kanchu Kota(1967)
 Niluvu Dopidi (1968)
Pettandarulu (1970)
 Desoddharakulu (1973)
 Nagna Sathyam (1979)
 Harischandrudu (1980)
 Keerthi Kantha Kanakan (1982)
 Pellila Chadarangam (1988)

Awards
National Film Awards 
Best Feature Film in Telugu (director) - Nagna Sathyam (1979)
Best Feature Film in Telugu (director) - Harischandrudu (1980)

Nandi Awards
Best Director - Keerthi Kantha Kanakan (1982)
Best Screenplay Writer - Pellila Chadarangam (1988)

Other awards
Honorary award from Dadasaheb Phalke Academy Mumbai

References

2021 deaths
Telugu film directors
Telugu film producers
Nandi Award winners
Film producers from Andhra Pradesh
Screenwriters from Andhra Pradesh
Place of death missing
Deaths from the COVID-19 pandemic in India
Telugu screenwriters
Film directors from Andhra Pradesh
20th-century Indian film directors
Year of birth missing